This article provides details of international football games played by the Senegal national football team from 2010 to 2019.

Results

2010

2011

2012

2013

2014

2015

2016

2017

2018

2019

Notes

References

External links

Football in Senegal
Senegal national football team
2010s in Senegalese sport